Karl Buchholz (23 February 1849, Schloßvippach - 29 May 1889 in Oberweimar) was a German landscape painter who worked in oils and watercolors. He also produced drawings and etchings. His output was rather small and his works are widely scattered.

Life and work 
In 1867, he became a student at the Grand-Ducal Saxon Art School, Weimar. His primary instructor there was the landscape painter, Max Schmidt. From 1871, he was a Master Student of Professor Theodor Hagen at the Kunstakademie Düsseldorf. His instruction included the practice of painting en plein aire, based on the teachings of the Barbizon School.

He set up his own studio immediately after completing his studies. He preferred simple pictures, with barren areas or trivial items occupying the center of the canvas. Great attention was given to lighting effects for the appropriate time of day. Most of his works were painted in the area immediately around Weimar, although he also worked in the Harz Mountains and Thuringia. Lovis Corinth was especially attracted to his work and called him a genius.

He committed suicide at the age of forty.

References

Further reading 
 Eckart Kissling, Hendrik Ziegler: Karl Buchholz 1849–1889. E. A. Seemann, 2000, .
 Buchholz, Karl. In: Friedrich von Boetticher: Malerwerke des 19. Jahrhunderts. Beitrag zur Kunstgeschichte. Vol.1/1, Boetticher's Verlag, Dresden 1891 Online
 Hans Rosenhagen: "Carl Buchholz". In: Kunst und Künstler: illustrierte Monatsschrift für bildende Kunst und Kunstgewerbe. #7, 1907, Online

External links 

More works by Buchholz @ ArtNet

1849 births
1889 deaths
19th-century German painters
19th-century German male artists
German landscape painters
Painters who committed suicide
1880s suicides